Maryfield is a village in the Canadian province of Saskatchewan within the Rural Municipality of Maryfield No. 91 and Census Division No. 1. The village lies south of the intersection of Highway 48 and Highway 600 and is about 8 km west of the Manitoba border. It is a junction point on the Canadian National Railway between the main line heading northwest towards Regina and a branch line heading southwest toward Carlyle and Lampman.

History 
Maryfield incorporated as a village on August 21, 1907.

Demographics 

Climate

Notable people 

 Brock Lesnar, American professional wrestler and mixed martial artist, lives in Maryfield with his wife and fellow professional wrestler Sable
 Joel Laing, Canadian ice hockey player, born and raised in Maryfield
 Val Sweeting, Canadian curler, grew up in Maryfield

See also 

 List of communities in Saskatchewan
 Villages of Saskatchewan

References

Villages in Saskatchewan
Maryfield No. 91, Saskatchewan
Division No. 1, Saskatchewan